Narco-state (also narco-capitalism or narco-economy) is a political and economic term applied to countries where all legitimate institutions become penetrated by the power and wealth of the illegal drug trade. The term was first used to describe Bolivia following the 1980 coup of Luis García Meza which was seen to be primarily financed with the help of narcotics traffickers. Other well-known examples are Honduras, Guinea-Bissau, Mexico, Myanmar and Syria, where drug cartels produce, ship and sell drugs such as captagon, cocaine, heroin and marijuana.

The term is often seen as ambiguous because of the differentiation between narco-states. The overall description would consist of illegal organisations that either produce, ship or sell drugs and hold a grip on the legitimate institutions through force, bribe or blackmail. This situation can arise in different forms. For instance, Colombia, where drug lord Pablo Escobar ran the Medellín Cartel (named after his birthplace) during most of the 1970s and 1980s, producing and trafficking cocaine to the United States of America. Escobar managed to take over control of most of the police forces in Medellín and surrounding areas due to bribery and coercion, allowing him to expand his drug trafficking business.

Currently scholars argue that the term “narco-state” is oversimplified because of the underlying networks running the drug trafficking organisations. For example, the Guadalajara Cartel in Mexico, led by Miguel Ángel Félix Gallardo, who managed to combine several small drug trafficking families into one overarching cartel controlling the marijuana production in the rural areas of Mexico  while trafficking Colombian cocaine to the US at the same time.

Over time the cocaine market expanded to Europe, leading to new routes being discovered from Colombia through Brazil or Venezuela and Western Africa. These new routes proved to be more profitable and successful than shipping from North-America and turned African states such as Nigeria, Ghana , and (later on) Guinea-Bissau into actual narco-states. While cocaine was transported through Western Africa, the Taliban produced opium in the rural areas of Afghanistan using the revenues to fund their guerrilla war. Despite American and NATO efforts to impose laws on the Afghan opium production, the early 2000s incumbent Afghan governments shielded the opium trade from foreign policies as much as possible. As of 2021, Syria's Assad regime is regarded as the world's largest narco-state; with an estimated global Captagon export worth 30-57 billion dollars annually. Revenue from the illicit drug exports accounts for around 90% of the revenue of the Assad regime.

Ongoing discussions divide scholars into separate groups either claiming or disclaiming the resemblance between narco-states and failed states. Depending on which properties are assigned to the definition of a failed state, the definition is in accordance with the narco-state. While most narco-states show signs of high rates of corruption, violence and murder, properties that are also assigned to failed states, it is not always clear if violence can be traced back to drug trafficking. Obvious to say is that failed states are not consequently narco-states, but uncertain is whether all narco-states are also failed states.

Usage 
It has been argued that narco-states can be divided into five categories depending on their level of dependence on the narcotics trade and the threat the narcotics trade in said country poses to domestic and international stability. These five categories are (in ascending order): incipient, developing, serious, critical, and advanced.

However, recent use of the term narco-state has been questioned by some for being too widely and uncritically applied, particularly following the widespread media attention given to Guinea-Bissau as "the world's first narco-state" in 2008, and should instead refer only to those countries in which the narcotics trade is state-sponsored and constitutes the majority of a country's overall GDP.

Examples

Afghanistan 
Afghanistan was very well known for its opium production. As of 2021, Afghanistan's harvest produces more than 90% of illicit heroin globally, and more than 95% of the European supply. Most of the opium were smuggled through Herat and Faizabad. The opium were mostly smuggled to the Golden Crescent countries such as Iran and Pakistan. Opium production and trafficking are known to have funded the Taliban's military activities and insurgency

Albania 
The economy's reliance on drug trade and smuggling has led the country to be declared as Europe's only narco-state.

Bolivia 
The drug trade in Bolivia gained its prominence in 1980s, when the demand for cocaine was booming across the Latin America. Bolivia's most lucrative crop and economic activity in the 1980s was coca, whose leaves were processed clandestinely into cocaine. The country was the second largest grower of coca in the world, supplying approximately fifteen percent of the US cocaine market in the late 1980s. Analysts believed that exports of coca paste and cocaine generated between US$600 million and US$1 billion annually in the 1980s (depending on prices and output).

In 1980, General Luis García Meza staged a coup and overthrew President Lidia Gueiler Tejada in a bloody coup d'état allegedly aided by drug cartels. The dictatorship of García Meza was very well known for its state sponsored drug trafficking activities. García Meza's regime oversaw Bolivia's 13-month period of isolation. The Reagan administration distanced themselves from García Meza's regime and halted some aid to Bolivia due to the regime's relationship with drug cartels. García Meza's time in office was short-lived as he was overthrown and replaced by General Celso Torrelio. García Meza was convicted in absentia for his human rights violations in Bolivia, as well as extradited from Brazil in 1995 and sentenced to serve 30 years in a Bolivian prison. His collaborator, Colonel Luis Arce Gómez, was extradited to the United States to serve his sentences for drug trafficking in a United States federal prison.

The 1980s coup was said to have been financed by Bolivia's most notorious drug baron, Roberto Suárez Goméz. Suárez Goméz was the founder of La Corporación, a Bolivian drug cartel tied to Pablo Escobar's Medellin Cartel. The organization was founded in the 1970s and mainly focused in Santa Cruz de la Sierra; it amassed $400 million annually. The cocaine shipped from the Bolivian Amazon to Colombia was valued at $9,000 per kilogram. In 1988, Suárez Goméz was arrested by the Bolivian National Police and sentenced to 15 years in prison; his nephew Jorge Roca Suarez continued his business until his arrest in 1990.

Brazil 

Since 1990, the phenomenon of urban violence has intensified. There are currently more than fifty criminal factions in Brazil.

Former president Jair Bolsonaro's family has been linked to what is called "milícias", composed of police officers and other government officials engaged in narcotrafic. One of aides, whom has been charged a 2 million euro fine over cocaine transportation, is being investigated for using an official airplane and the president's credit card for drug-trafficking. During the presidential election of 2022, Bolsonaro supporters spread fake news regarding Lula's supposed links to criminal factions, of which there is no evidence.

Other politicians, such as the former president Fernando Collor de Mello, which was impeached, has been investigated for mobster relations.

Colombia 

Beginning in the mid-1970s Colombian drug cartels became major producers, processors and exporters of illegal drugs, primarily marijuana and cocaine. The drug trade in Colombia was monopolized by four drug trafficking cartels: Medellin, Cali, Norte del Valle, and North Coast. However some guerilla warlords in the Colombian conflict were also said to be involved in drug trafficking in the country.

The Medellin Cartel was once the largest drug cartel operating in Colombia, led by Pablo Escobar which focused its operations in the city of Medellin. Most of the imported drugs are originated from countries like Bolivia and Peru which were later processed in Colombia. The Medellin Cartel gained prominence in the 1980s when the cartel amassed $60 million worth of fortune from drug trade sold to United States mainly focused on Florida, New York, and California. This condition has shocked the United States federal government and caused the federal government to make a deal with Colombian government to sign the extradition treaty between two countries. Escobar's business empire was known for its "reign of terror" as the cartel staged numerous kidnappings, assassinations and bombings around Colombia to ensure its business continuity. Pablo Escobar was shot to death by police in 1993; after the death of Pablo Escobar, the Medellin Cartel began to decline which eventually led to its disbandment. The disbandment of the Medellin Cartel has led to other three major cartels, especially the Cali Cartel, to seize the opportunity to expand their trade routes.

During the drug war, major Colombian cartels were known to be influencing Colombian politicians and warlords alike. In order to flex his muscle, Escobar went to politics and ran as candidate for the Chamber of Representatives under the banner of the Liberal Alternative. However Escobar's ambition in politics was later thwarted after his ill-gotten wealth was exposed in front of the representatives, which forced him to resign. This event become the root cause of the assassination of justice minister Rodrigo Lara Bonilla. In contrast to the Medellin Cartel, the Cali Cartel adopted a more subtle approach on influencing local politicians. In 1994, the outgoing president Ernesto Samper was involved in the Proceso 8000 scandal in which he was accused of being funded with drug money, allegedly from the Cali Cartel for his campaign in the 1994 Colombian presidential election. The scandal later caused the then US president Bill Clinton to cut Colombian aid, while later the US government revoked Samper's visa.

Guinea-Bissau 
Guinea-Bissau, in West Africa, has been called a narco-state due to government officials often being bribed by traffickers to ignore the illegal trade. Colombian drug cartels used the West African coast as Jamaica and Panama increased policing. The Guardian noted Guinea-Bissau's lack of prisons, few police, and poverty attracted the traffickers. An article in Foreign Policy questioned the effectiveness of money from the United States, the European Union, and the United Nations designated to combat the illegal trade.

Honduras 
Honduras has been labeled as a narco-state due to drug trafficking involvement of President Juan Orlando Hernández and his brother Tony Hernández, who was a congressman. Tony Hernández was captured in 2018 in the United States and was accused of conspiracy of cocaine trafficking to the US in 2019. Also Fabio Lobo, who is the son of former president Porfirio Lobo, was arrested by DEA agents in Haiti in 2015. All of them are members of the conservative right-wing National Party of Honduras.

Iran 
Since 2017, a sudden surge in crystal meth production and smuggling from Iran has contributed to a drug epidemic in neighboring Iraq and Turkey.

Lebanon 
Illegal drugs trading pervaded in Lebanon since the 1960s. In 2014, Lebanese authorities seized 25.4m Captagon tablets at the airport and Port of Beirut. In April 2015, the European Council stated that Lebanon became a transit country for drug trafficking.

In April 2021, Greek authorities seized four tonnes of cannabis hidden in dessert-making machinery at Piraeus, which was en route from Lebanon to Slovakia. In the same month, 5.3m Captagon pills hidden in fruits imported from Lebanon were seized by authorities in Saudi Arabia. In May 2021, Lebanese authorities confiscated cocaine hidden in Makdous, destined to Australia. In the same month, Lebanese customs at Beirut Airport seized 60 tonnes of hashish, intended to be exported to the Netherlands.

Mexico 

Government corruption has been a problem in Mexico for decades. Drug cartels have been influential in Mexican politics, going so far as to pump large sums of money into Mexican electoral campaigns, supporting candidates sensitive to bribery in order to keep their businesses safe. As far back as the early 20th century, drug trafficking had been tolerated by the Mexican government. Since 1929, the dominant party of Mexico, the Institutional Revolutionary Party (PRI), forged ties with various groups in order to gain political influence. Among them were the drug traffickers. The ties between the PRI and the drug lords became so close that the PRI even went so far as to have an alliance with the drug traffickers and sanctioned their activities.

During the 1980s and 1990s the drug trade in Mexico accelerated. Before the 1980s most of Mexico produced marijuana and a small amount of heroin. Cocaine mostly reached the US through the Bahamas and the Caribbean. After the US shut down the routes that entered the state of Florida, Colombian drug cartels established a partnership with Mexican traffickers, finding new routes by which to smuggle cocaine over land into North America. A few small Mexican cartels merged into the Guadalajara cartel, led by Miguel Ángel Félix Gallardo. The Guadalajara cartel trafficked the cocaine produced by the Colombian Calí cartel, while expanding marijuana production in rural areas of Mexico.

The US established a special force, named the Drug Enforcement Administration (DEA), to fight a war on drugs within their own borders and beyond. The DEA office in Mexico received extra resources to investigate the murder of one of their own agents, Enrique "Kiki" Camarena, who was abducted, tortured and murdered by a state police officer paid by members of the cartel. Their investigation confirmed the corruption that gripped Mexico in the 1980s and 1990s. However, not only police officers on the payroll obeyed Miguel Ángel Félix Gallardo and his cartel. Investigations show transactions to high officers in the federal government, such as the Federal Directorate of Security and the Mexican Federal Judicial Police.

The beginning of the Mexican Drug War in 2006, initiated by Mexico's newly elected president, Felipe Calderón, was the first significant government effort to fight the drug cartels in Mexico. Calderón's predecessor, Vicente Fox, elected in 2000, had been the first Mexican president from outside the PRI. However, despite Calderón's efforts, the PRI was returned to power in 2012 with the election of Enrique Peña Nieto.

During the court hearing for the most wanted cartel leader, Joaquín "El Chapo" Guzmán, it was alleged that former president Enrique Peña Nieto had accepted a $100 million bribe from the drug kingpin.

On 1 December 2018, Mexico elected a new president, Andrés Manuel López Obrador (AMLO). Despite presenting himself as being non-established, AMLO was a member of the PRI from 1976 to 1989.

Myanmar 

Myanmar is the second-largest opium producing nation in the world, only behind Afghanistan. The opium trade network in Myanmar indirectly created a network that widely known as Golden Triangle, a term coined by CIA in the area around the Myanmar, Laos, and Thailand border. The Mopium production in Myanmar dated back during the period of Konbaung dynasty.

In aftermath of the Chinese civil war, some Kuomintang loyalists stranded in Burma became involved in opium trade in Burma, supported by the US government. Most of the opium produced by the former-Kuomintang soldiers was shipped south to Thailand. One of the most notorious figure in Myanmar drug business was Khun Sa, who was also trained by Burmese Army and the Kuomintang. Khun Sa operations said to have dominated the drug trade network in the Golden Triangle area giving him the title "Opium King". Khun Sa influence began to decline in 1990s and he surrendered himself to the authorities in 1996.

North Korea 
The international isolation imposed at North Korea has made the North Korean regime rely on illicit activities to support its economy, drug trade being one of the illicit activities that is used by the regime. The North Korean regime was known to have operated a drug trading activities varying from opium to methamphetamine. The regime drug trade network dated back in 1970s, when then leader Kim Il Sung sanctioned the creation of opium farm in the country. The methamphetamine trade was dated back around 1990s, the regime was known to have spreading the drugs to China Jilin Province as its important transshipment which was later shipped to countries such as Philippines, the United States, Hong Kong, Thailand, western Africa and others. In 2001, income from illegal drugs amounted to between $500 million and $1 billion. In 2003, the North Korean owned cargo ship Pong Su was intercepted importing heroin into Australia. The ship was suspected of being involved in smuggling almost 125 kilograms (276 lb) of heroin into Australia with an estimated street value of A$160 million.

Netherlands 
As early as 1996, the Netherlands was labelled as a narco-state in a French government report. Since then, the question of whether the Netherlands is actually a narco-state has been asked many times and the answer depends strongly on which characteristics are attributed to a narco-state. In any case, the size of the drug sector in the Netherlands suggests that drug crime has been a persistent problem in the Netherlands for years and that the fight against it constantly poses complex questions to politics and criminal justice. In 2018, several police detectives stated in a report by the Dutch Police Association that the Netherlands "already exhibited a painful number of characteristics of a narco-state". Minister Grapperhaus of Justice and Security stated in a response that the Netherlands is not a narco-state. After the murder of lawyer Derk Wiersum and crime reporter Peter R. de Vries, the qualification of the Netherlands as a narco-state received new attention.

Nicaragua 
After the Nicaraguan Revolution, Sandinista National Liberation Front, led by Daniel Ortega, took the national government of Nicaragua from the Somoza dynasty. In 1980s the Sandinista government was accused of helping Pablo Escobar's Medellin Cartel by giving him access to a drug trafficking corridor that runs in Nicaragua as well. According to the United States diplomatic cables leak, Ortega was said to receive drug money in order to influence the 2008 local elections in the country. Another cable also stated that Nicaraguan officials returned from Venezuela with a briefcase full of cash, indicating potential government involvement with drug cartels.

Panama 

The dictatorship of Manuel Noriega owned a state sponsored drug trade network which gave Panama a reputation of being a narco-state at the time. Noriega was well known to be involved in illegal drugs and arms trade which was dubbed as his "cash cow". Between 1981 until 1987, the Noriega regime had a cordial relationship with the United States due to mutual interest in which Noriega government helped arming the Contras in Nicaragua in which the US ignored Noriega illegal activities in exchange. Noriega involvement in drug trafficking grows rapidly in 1980s which reached its peak in 1984. The conflict in Colombia and Central American countries gave Noriega opportunity to transport cocaine to United States. Noriega regime also made an alliance with the Medellin Cartel. However, in 1984, Noriega began to reduce his drug operation by targeting Jorge Ochoa and Gilberto Rodríguez Orejuela money laundering operations in order to clean his reputations which gave him positive image among American government elites. In the late 80s the United States relations with Noriega regime deteriorated after Noriega was accused for selling intelligences to Cuba. It was also reported that Hugo Spadafora, Noriega most prominent critic who was assassinated by his regime reported Noriega drug operations to the Drug Enforcement Administration. The United States would later invade Panama and captured Noriega, ending his regime. Noriega was later trialed in three countries; France, United States, and Panama and eventually died in 2017.

Suriname 
Suriname has been labeled as a narco-state due to President Dési Bouterse and his family involvement in drug trafficking. Bouterse was sentenced in absentia in the Netherlands to 11 years' imprisonment after being convicted of trafficking  of cocaine. His son Dino Bouterse has been arrested twice in three different countries and currently serving 16 years imprisonment in the United States on charge of drug trafficking.

Syria 
Syria is home to a burgeoning illegal drugs industry run by associates and relatives of the Syrian dictator, Bashar al-Assad. The industry is run by a clandestine network of warlords, drug cartels, crime families and business men loyal to the Assad dynasty, operating across the regions of Syria and Lebanon. It mainly produces captagon, an addictive amphetamine popular in the Arab world. Another major drug which is manufactured and smuggled globally is hashish. As of 2021, the export of illegal drugs eclipsed the country's legal exports, leading the New York Times to call Syria "the world’s newest narcostate". The drug exports allow the Syrian government to generate hard currency, pay daily wages for deteriorating state army, finance private militias and hire mercenaries. Centre of Operational Analysis and Research reported in 2021 that Assad regime has turned Syria into "the global epicentre of Captagon production, which is now more industrialised, adaptive, and technically sophisticated than ever."

During its occupation of Lebanon during 1976–2005, Assad regime used its proxies in Lebanon for establishing its multi-billion dollar drug industry. Syria was labeled as a narco-state by the United States for nearly a decade until 1997. Throughout the Syrian occupation of Lebanon when they controlled the cannabis cultivation in the Beqaa Valley in Lebanon, Assad regime was the Middle East region's main source of hashish.

During the Syrian Civil War, Assad regime began mass production of drugs within Syria, and officers fed their men fenethylline, which they called "Captain Courage." Several shipments containing tonnes of amphetamines were seized in different countries smuggled from Syria, those shipments had sometimes millions of pills of fenethylline, which production in the country started since at least 2006. After 2013, captogen production and export in Syria skyrocketed, with the direct support of the Assad regime; and its multi-billion dollar profits exceeded the total GDP. By 2020, Syria had become the world's biggest centre of captogen production, sales and exports. 

One of the largest drug seizures occurred in Palermo port in July 2020, when the Italian police busted more than 84 million Captogen tablets worth a billion dollars, shipped from the Syrian port of Latakia, leading to international outcry. The case was tied to Camorra Mafia, a crime syndicate based in Naples. In November 2020, two drug shipments of hashish coming from Syria were seized by Egyptian authorities, the first shipment which arrived to Alexandria, included 2 tonnes of hashish, while the second shipment had 6 tonnes and was found at the Damietta port. The port of Latakia became under scrutiny of European and American police, as being favored by smugglers. In May 2021, Turkish security forces used UAVs to stop 1.5 tonnes of marijuana being smuggled out of Syria. According to the Centre for Operational Analysis and Research (COAR), Syrian seized drugs in 2020 had the value of no less than $3.4bn.

The New York Times reported in December 2021 that the 4th Armoured Division, commanded by Maher al-Assad, oversees much of the production and distribution of Captagon, among other drugs, reinforcing Syria's status as a narco-state on the Mediterranean sea. The unit controls manufacturing facilities, packing plants, and smuggling networks all across Syria (which have started to also move crystal meth). The division's security bureau, headed by Maj. Gen. Ghassan Bilal, provides protection for factories and along smuggling routes to the port city Latakia and to border crossings with Jordan and Lebanon. The captagon industry is also supported by the Iran-backed Shia fundamentalist group Hezbollah. Overall assets worth 5.7 billion $ of Captagon exports from Syria were seized across the world during the year 2021. Southern Europe, North Africa, Turkey and the Gulf States are the major destinations of Syria's drug exports.

In January 2022, the Jordanian military killed 27 drug smugglers who attempted to infiltrate via the Syrian border. 17,000 packets of hashish and 17 million Captagon pills were busted during the first qurater of 2022, a figure much higher than during the whole of 2021. Sources from the Jordanian army revealed that the drug trade is financed by a well-funded network of armed militias. In May 2022, the Jordanian government accused Iran of launching a "drug war" against the country, through its Khomeinist proxy militias based in Syria's southern regions. Officials in the Jordanian army described the rise in drug smuggling as part of an "undeclared war" waged to subvert "families, morals and values". In March 2022, international drug lord Bruno Carbone, leader of the Camorra syndicate, was captured by the Syrian Salvation Government and extradited to Italy by November. Law enforcement officers calculate that seized captagon constitute merely around 5-10% of total exports originating from Syria in 2021, indicating the presence of a thriving drug industry worth atleast 57 billion dollars, an amount ten times greater than the regime's yearly budget.

Venezuela 
More recently, Venezuela has been labeled a narco-state, due to the relations between some Venezuelan government officials to drug cartels and criminal factions all across Latin America. For example, former vice president of Venezuela Tareck el Aissami has been accused of supporting drug trafficking and helping Mexican drug cartels. El Aissami has been sanctioned by the United States since 2017. The nephews and sons of Venezuela's president Nicolas Maduro are also being accused of financing drug trades and being involved in the Narcosobrinos affair. In November 2017, the United States's UN ambassador Nikki Haley accused Venezuela of being a "dangerous narco-state".

See also
 Crack epidemic in the United States
 Mafia state
 Narco-submarine
 Narcokleptocracy
 Philippine Drug War
 State Sponsors of Terrorism (U.S. list)

Notes

References

Further reading

External links
 "The Economics of Cocaine Capitalism" by Rensselaer Lee, COSMOS Journal, 1996

Capitalism
Illegal drug trade
Drug policy
Oligarchy